NGC 5557 is an elliptical galaxy in the constellation Boötes. It was discovered by William Herschel on May 1, 1785. The distance to NGC 5557 is not well known, but it is estimated to be about 127 million light-years (38.8 megaparsecs) away.

NGC 5557 is quite massive, with a K-band absolute magnitude of −24.8, and is a slow rotator, which suggests it gained mass through dry mergers (galaxy mergers involving galaxies significant amounts of gas). However, it has a faint tidal tail to its east, as well as a more complex structure to the west. This structure, if found to be connected to NGC 5557, would one of the largest around a galaxy, spanning about 1.1 million light-years (350,000 parsecs). This filamentary structure suggests that NGC 5557 may have formed from a more gas-rich galaxy merger a couple billion years ago. This implies that the galaxy merger would need to have a low impact parameter.

NGC 5557 is part of a galaxy group, and is the largest such galaxy in the group by far. Surrounding the galaxy near the eastern filament are several small bluish objects, which are possibly tidal dwarf galaxies.

References

External links 
 

Boötes
5557
Elliptical galaxies